Afro-Asiatic may refer to:
 Relating to Africa and Asia
 Afro-Asiatic languages
 Proto-Afro-Asiatic language, the reconstructed common ancestor of all Afro-Asiatic languages
 An older name for Afro-Asian, mixed race people of African and Asian descent